Ecgonine (tropane derivative) is a tropane alkaloid found naturally in coca leaves.  It has a close structural relation to cocaine: it is both a metabolite and a precursor, and as such, it is a controlled substance in many jurisdictions, as are some substances which can be used as precursors to ecgonine itself.

Structurally, ecgonine is a cycloheptane derivative with a nitrogen bridge. It is obtained by hydrolysis of cocaine with acids or alkalis, and crystallizes with one molecule of water, the crystals melting at 198–199 °C. It is levorotary, and on warming with alkalis gives iso-ecgonine, which is dextrorotary.

It is a tertiary base, and has the properties of an acid and an alcohol. It is the carboxylic acid corresponding to tropine, for it yields the same products on oxidation, and by treatment with phosphorus pentachloride is converted into anhydroecgonine, C9H13NO2, which, when heated to 280 °C with hydrochloric acid, eliminates carbon dioxide and yields tropidine, C8H13N.

See also 
 Coca alkaloids
 Anhydroecgonine
 Cocaethylene
 Dihydrocuscohygrine
 Methylecgonidine
 Salicylmethylecgonine
 Tropinone
 Troparil

References 

Tropane alkaloids found in Erythroxylum coca
Secondary alcohols
Carboxylic acids